The Juno Awards of 2022 were held on May 15, 2022 in Toronto, Ontario. 
The awards were presented at the Budweiser Stage, an outdoor venue, and was hosted by actor Simu Liu.

They were planned as an in-person gala ceremony, for the first time in three years due to the COVID-19 pandemic in Canada. This was the first time the ceremony had been held in Toronto since the Juno Awards of 2011 (they were scheduled to hold an in-person ceremony in 2021, but were unable to do so due to the COVID-19 pandemic).

Special awards
Deborah Cox was announced as 2022's inductee into the Canadian Music Hall of Fame, Susan Aglukark was named the winner of the Juno Humanitarian Award, and Shawn Mendes was honoured with a special International Achievement Award to honour his global impact in music.

Category changes
Several category changes were announced by Canadian Academy of Recording Arts and Sciences chair Allen Reid at the 2021 Juno Awards. Beginning in 2022, the former award for Rap Recording of the Year was split into two new categories for Rap Album/EP of the Year and Rap Single of the Year, the former award for Indigenous Artist or Group of the Year was split into new categories for Contemporary Indigenous Artist of the Year and Traditional Indigenous Artist of the Year, and a new category was introduced for Underground Dance Single of the Year.

Live performances
Liu opened the ceremony with an updated riff on the 2000 "I Am Canadian" beer commercial, highlighting contemporary signifiers such as multicultural food, runaway housing prices and the legalization of marijuana. Later in the ceremony, he also sang a short parody of Avril Lavigne's hit single "Complicated", with lyrics about his own rise from a working Canadian actor to a major movie star.

Arkells — "Reckoning"/"You Can Get It"
Tesher — "Jalebi Baby"
Lauren Spencer-Smith — "Fingers Crossed"
Haviah Mighty — "So So"/"Protest"
Charlotte Cardin — "Meaningless"
Mustafa — "Stay Alive"
Avril Lavigne — "Complicated"/"Bite Me"/"Girlfriend"/"Sk8er Boi"/"I'm with You"
DJ Shub & Snotty Nose Rez Kids — "War Club"
Deborah Cox — "Where Do We Go from Here"/"Nobody's Supposed to Be Here"/"Who Do U Love"/"Beautiful U R"
bbno$ — "Lalala"/"edamame"
Arcade Fire — "Unconditional I (Lookout Kid)"

Winners and nominees
Nominees were announced on 1 March 2022.

People

Albums

Songs and recordings

Other

References

2022
Music festivals in Toronto
2022 in Toronto
2022 in Canadian music
2022 music awards
May 2022 events in Canada